The Ministry of Rural Rehabilitation and Development (MRRD) is a ministry of the Afghan government. Its main headquarters is located in Kabul, Afghanistan, but has offices and employees in all the 34 provinces of the country. MRRD's mission is to contribute to poverty alleviation in rural areas by empowering communities and fostering economic and social opportunities.

Programs
The Ministry manages five national programmes:

 The National Solidarity Programme (NSP)
 Through this programme, MRRD, with the support of facilitating partners, mobilises communities, organises elections to establish Community Development Councils, builds capacity of elected members to manage projects, and provides grants to the communities so they can implement projects they have prioritised. 
 The National Area-Based Development Programme (NABDP)
 Works at the district level and organises the establishment of District Development Assemblies (DDAs). The programme trains DDA members on several issues pertaining to rural development and implements projects identified as priorities by DDAs. 
 The Rural Water Sanitation and Irrigation Programme
 Provides access to potable water and sanitation facilities to rural people. It also provides hygiene education and works on small scale irrigation infrastructure.
 The National Rural Access Programme (NRAP)
 Builds and rehabilitates tertiary and secondary roads.
 The Afghanistan Rural Enterprise Development Programme (AREDP)
 Supports the formation of Saving Groups, Village Saving and Loans Associations, and Enterprise Groups in rural areas. It also supports the development of Small and Medium Enterprises, facilitating their access to financial products and providing them with technical support.

MRRD offers training on rural development issues through its Afghanistan Institute for Rural Development.

Previous Ministers

References

External links
Official website

Rural Rehabilitation and Development